Osisioma Ngwa is a Local Government Area of Abia state of Nigeria. Its headquarters are located in Osisioma town.

Origin of name
The name "Osisi" means tree, plant or wood and the name "Oma", means good, fine, beautiful in the Igbo language. Thus, Osisioma means: good tree or fine plant or beautiful wood. It is a name associated with tree and beauty which is derived from the popular ornamental flower tree called Delonix regia, a species of flowering plant in the bean family Fabaceae, and subfamily Caesalpinioideae. It is noted for its fern-like leaves and flamboyant display of flowers. In many tropical parts of the world, it is grown as an ornamental tree and in English, it is given the name royal poinciana, flamboyant, flame of the forest, or flame tree (one of several species given this name) which is typically planted to decorate courtyards in houses in Osisioma Ngwa. A greater part of Aba city is in Osisioma Ngwa stretching up to Faulks Road.

Culture
Osisioma people generally make a living as farmers, traders, artisans and craftsmen. The typical Osisioma Ngwa men in the old days usually wear what is called "ọgọdọ". Ọgọdọ is a type of white woven cloth tied around the waistline to cover nakedness and the women use the fabric as a wrapper to cover the body from chest flowing down to the knees. Contemporarily, just like most Igbo communities, men dress down in trousers and shirts with shoes, sandals or slippers to work, shop or office just like their female counterparts but the traditional male attire preferred for occasions and big celebrations in Osisioma culture consists of a special top called 'Isiagụ' and trousers of any colour usually worn with sandals or shoes and red cap to match.

Geography
Osisioma Ngwa is a flat land without hills or mountains and has a headwater located at Okpu Umuobo that runs through the thick forest cutting across into the city of Aba River waterside in Ogbor Hill. The river is a tributary of the Imo River located in the Southern part of Nigeria.  Osisioma Ngwa shares boundaries with Ukwa West and Ugwunagbo in the South, Aba South LGA and Aba North LGA in the East, Isiala Ngwa South LGA in the North and Omuma LGA, Rivers State in the West.

Aba-Port Harcourt Expressway cuts through Osisioma Ngwa with the Aba-Owerri Road running through it from Aba Town Hall down to Olaz Oil filling station.

It has other major routes such as the NNPC depot road which leads to Osisioma Ngwa local government headquarters as well as Osisioma Police Divisional Headquarters, High and Magistrates Court and Ekeakpara market down to Owerrinta the boundary between Abia State and Imo State.

Economy
Agriculture is the major occupation of the people of Osisioma Ngwa. They are mostly subsistence farmers and grow Cassava, Oil Palm, Rafia Palm, Vegetable, Ube (Local Pear), Plantain, Okra, Maize, melon, red pepper, yam, and cocoa yam. Some people rear animals such as goats, sheep, fowl and occasionally cattle, but largely don't grow crops or rear animals in commercial quantity.

Industries and companies
 Tonimas Group 
 Chemlap Nigeria Ltd.
 J. Udeagbala Holdings
 Guinness Nigeria Plc 
 NNPC Aba Depot
 Valleumbra Nigeria Limited
 VON Nigeria Limited
 Pitason Nigeria Limited
 Nicen Nigeria Limited
 Clover Paints Nigeria Limited
 Adaobi Nig Ltd
 Geometric Nigeria Limited
 Polema Industries Limited, to mention but a few
 Chriveld Petroleum Ltd.

Autonomous communities
Community leadership in Osisioma Ngwa is designated on the Traditional Ruler popularly called "Eze" which means King. The Eze is a person widely perceived to represent a community in its traditional religion and socio-economic development. The position of a traditional ruler is not hereditary and is subjected to the democratic process of nomination, selection, appointment and coronation of the eligible candidate among peers who contested for the post by the state Governor.

Various towns in Osisioma Ngwa LGA are divided into Autonomous communities which are spearheaded by a traditional ruler and they are as follows:

 OTUOBI: Umuigbe, Umuokwaa, Umuokereke, Umugwu, Umuodu, Ovoro, Umuadiele, Umuehehe, Umuogwe, Umuokorocha and others.
 ISIALA OSOKWA: Umuokereugo, Umuokere, Umuosi, Umuagwa, Umuohuonu, Umuegbe, Umuelekwa, Umuokpoo.
 MBUTUOMA: Mbutu Umugaa, Mbutu Isi Ahia, Mbutu Umuejije, Umuochuala.
 IBEKU NGWA AMAISE: Okoro, Nkali, Ugwuala, Agwu, Akiri.
 MGBOKO UMUETTE: Umuikocha, Umuabuwa, Umuonyeichi, Umuelele, Umuafara, Osusu-Umuenyioma.
 AMUZU UMUNNEOKPU: Umuobasi-Ukwu, Njara Ukwu, Umuasomaji, Mbutu Ukazi, Umunwajere, Umuafornjara, Umunwankwougwu, Umuagbam.
 ISIALA OKPU: Amaiyi, Umuadiele, Ebere na Onwu, Umuodu, Umunwogu, Umunkarugbara, Umuagbam.
 AHIABA ALAOCHA: Amaugba, Umuonyembi, Umuamadi, Umuogine, Amawom, Umuekeji.
 OKPUALA UMUGWOR: Umuokwukwe, Umule, Umuokorocha, Umuajienyi, Umuiroma, Umuwomada, Umuadikwuru, Umunwokocha.
 ASA AMANO: Umuogba, Umuaja, Umuanyaonwu, Umuekeme, Asa Umudioka, Asa Amoka, Asa Oberete.
 ODE UKWU: Umunkwocha, Umuagwu, Okpokoroala, Umunwankwo, Osokoro, Umuobia, Umuoru, Umunwankwo Diokpa, Ichi, Umunwarie.
 AMATOR: Umuagbai, Umugwu, Amaogwugwu, Umule, Umuokoro-ukwu, Umuakatta, Umueneregbe, Umuchima, Umuagwu.
 NJIKO UMUNNA: Egbelu-Umuegoro, Umukaegbu, Umugwo, Umungwaba, Umunwakwo Asonye, Ugboekpe, Umuogbaraegbe, Umuaduru, Umuoru, Umuokoroafor, Umuihudinma, Umuogogo.
 AMASATO: Umungasi, Umuchichi, Umule.
 ARO-NGWA: Umuohia, Umuonyeukwu, Umuejie, Umuotutu, Umuarakpa.
 ETITI AMAVO: Umuegoro, Ule Nwaghinna, Umunwangwa, Umuosouhie, Umuokereke, Umunkaru, Umuonwunata, Umuchima.
 UMUKA ARO: Umuevo, Umunkoro, Umuokorouka, Umuevuka, Umuama, Umuangara, Umuekpele, Umunwabughiogu, Umuogbonna.

Political districts and administrative wards
Abayi, Osisioma and Umungasi are the three major towns with Abayi-Ariaria, Umuojima-Ogbu and Umuakapara rapidly developing into towns. However, Osisioma Ngwa is divided into 10 wards and each ward has different villages in them and these villages also have kindred which are subdivided into clans and households called ‘onumara’. Thus, a village may be made up of 5 to 10 kindred and up to 20 to 30 clans and the household which uniformly constitutes what is called a village. The classification of these villages into wards was adopted by the colonial masters for effective administrative and political purpose and to ensure proper management and accountability. The wards are as follows:

1.	Ama – Asaa Ward which comprises
a.	Amapu Village
b.	Amauzu  Village
c.	Ibeku  Village
d.	Mbutunta Village
e.	Umuagwu Village
f.	Umuihima Village
g.	Umuihioma Village
h.	Umuimo-Osisiasaa Village
i.	Umuimo-Amaogwugwu Village
j.	Umuimo-Egbelu Village
k.	Umuobasi Village
l.	Ekeobasi Village Square

2.	Amaitolu/Mbutu/Umuojima Ward which comprises
a.	Ariaria Village
b.	Abayi Ogbuligba Village
c.	Umuechem Village
d.	Asamoka Village
e.	Mbutu Isiahia Village
f.	Mbutu Umugaa Village
g.	Umuozuo Village
h.	Umuikpo Village
i.	Oberete Village
j.	Ogbu Village
k.	Umudi Village
l.	Umuejijie Village
m.	Umuidigha Village
n.	Alaukwu-Asa Umumgbede Village
o.	Umuocheala Village
p.	Umuojima Ogbu Village
q.	Umuojima Okereke Village

3.	Amasator Ward which comprises
a.	Abayi Village
b.	Ahiaba Village
c.	Umungasi Village
d.	Umule Village
e.	Umuode Village
f.	Umuochichi Village
g.	Umueze Village
h.	Umuocham Village

4.	Amator Ward which comprise
a.	Amapu-Ife Village
b.	Amaogwugwu Village
c.	Umuagbai Village
d.	Umuoyoro Village
e.	Umuokiri Village
f.	Umuodu Village
g.	Umudike Village
h.	Umuokoro Village
i.	Umuigbe Village
j.	Umuokoroukwu Village

5.	Amavo Ward which comprises
a.	Umuokorocha Village
b.	Umuekpe Village
c.	Osiloji Village
d.	Umuoyoronta Village
e.	Umunwankwoala Village
f.	Umuokika Village
g.	Umudaba Village
h.	Umuagbalugba Village

6.	Aro-Ngwa Ward which comprises
a.	Obiekwesu Village
b.	Okpuala Aro Village
c.	Umuarakpa Village
d.	Umuekea Village
e.	Umuejie Village
f.	Umuoha Village
g.	Umuonyeukwu Village Village
h.	Umuotuo Village

7.	Okpu – Umuobo Ward which comprises
a.	Amuzu Village
b.	Mgboko Umuete Village
c.	Umuobo Village
d.	Umuaba Village
e.	Umuagwa Village
f.	Umuara Village
g.	Uratta Village
h.	Amaekpu Village

8.	Oso Okwa Ward which comprises
a.	Akpaa I Village
b.	Akpaa II Village
c.	Akpaa III Village
d.	Akpaa IV Village
e.	Amaiyi Village
f.	Amankwu I Village
g.	Amankwu II Village
h.	Amaugha Village
i.	OkpualaUkwu Village
j.	Umuaja Village
k.	Umuenyiukwu Village
l.	Umugala Village
m.	Umuncheagu Village
n.	Umunpata Village
o.	Umuobilohia I Village
p.	Umuobilohia II Village
q.	Umuohia Village’
r.	Umuokerete Village

9.	Umunneise Ward which comprises
a.	Amapu Village
b.	Amauzu Village
c.	Okpuala  Village
d.	Umumba Village

10.	Uratta Ward which comprises
a.	Amapu – Igbengwo Village
b.	Egbede Village
c.	Egbelu – Owo Village
d.	Ibibi Uratta Village
e.	Obuzor Village
f.	Okpokoroala Village
g.	Umuochor Village
h.	Umuaduru Village
i.	Umuagbara Village
j.	Umueji Village
k.	Umueke Village
l.	Umueze Village
m.	Umuigwe Village
n.	Umuikaa Village
o.	Umuodu – Ehichie Village
p.	Úmuokorogbu Village

Executive Chairmen 
Names of Executive Chairmen that have governed Osisioma Ngwa Local Government Area and Communities of origin:

 Chief Sylvanus Ejiasa Ubani		-	Obi Aro Ngwa
 Chief Emeka Eneogwe			-	Uratta
 Chief Allen Nwachukwu	 		-	Otuobi
 Dr Kamalu Christian 			-	Umuocham
 Chief Iheyinna Mgbeahuru 		-	Amavo Nkwogu

Institutions of learning

Education in Osisioma Ngwa receives little support from the State and Federal government, thereby opening up opportunities for private schools to thrive. However, these are some of the Secondary Schools:

 Ngwa High School, Abayi
 Girls' Secondary School, Abayi
 Umuocham Girls Senior Secondary School
 Osokwa Community Secondary School
 Comprehensive Senior Secondary School, Okpu-Umuobo
 City Laboratory Comprehensive Secondary School, Ariaria
 St. Leo The Great Secondary School, Oberete
 Uratta Comprehensive Secondary School, Egbede
 Royal Foundation College, Osisioma
 Mbutu Umuojima Community Secondary School, Umuojima Ogbu
 Heritage Comprehensive Secondary School, Ariaria
 Amator Technical Secondary School, Umuoyoro Ngwa
 Boys Secondary School, Abayi-Umuocham
 Community Secondary School, Umuojima Okereke
 St. Anne's Secondary School, Umuobasi Amavo

Osisioma does not have any State or Federal government institution of higher learning, college or university despite its large population and size.

Healthcare

 Isiala – Osokwa Health Center,
 Akanu – Ukwu Health Center,
 Okpuala Umugwor Health Center,
 Umuoyoro Ngwa Health Center,
 Owuala Primary Healthcare Center,
 Mbutu Umuojima Health Center,
 Umueze Health Center,
 Etiti-Amavo Health Center,
 Oberete Asa Health Center,
 Amankwu Osokwa Health Center,
 Eke Aro Health Center,
 Umuobasi Health Center,
 Umuagbara Health Center,
 Otuobi Health Center,
 Umuojima Okereke Health Center,
 Okpu Umuobo Health Center,
 World Bank Health Center,
 Ekenwaobasi Health Center,
 Umugaa Health Center.

These health centres have not been inspected and approved by the World Health Organization (WHO), The United Nation Children's Fund (UNICEF) and Federal Ministry of Health, Nigeria as standard healthcare facilities to take care of the well-being of residents in Osisioma Ngwa.

Religion
Traditionally, the people of Osisioma Ngwa worship a god called “chi” and every household builds a shrine which houses the deity. However, there are other gods such as ‘agwu’ and ‘owu Miri’, but as a result of British colonialism, Christianity was introduced and most families embraced Christianity.

The major Christian denominations in Osisioma Ngwa are the Anglican Church, the Catholic Church, the Seventh-Day Adventist Church and the Jehovah's Witnesses. There are also other churches as well as traditional adherents in some quarters.

Adherents of cultural tradition and worshippers of “chi”, “agwu”, “ihi Njoku” and “owu Miri” perform rites to celebrate New Yam Festivals (popularly called ‘Iwaji’ or ‘Ji Oghoo’), Masquerade Festivals (popularly called ‘Ekpe, mmanwu or ekpo’) and New Year Festivals (popularly called ‘afo oghoo’ or ‘ichu afo’) in honour of their gods and goddesses to mark these events.

Traditional rulers who are the custodian of these cultural values and traditions are in charge of announcing dates as well as organizing the venues for such celebrations and performance of traditional rites.

Landmarks and tourist attractions
Osisioma is not naturally endowed as other localities, but here are the few landmarks and tourist attractions.

 Ariaria International Market also referred to as Aba International Industrial Market which is the centre of trade and commerce in the city of Aba.
 NNPC Depot is a beehive of petroleum activity attracting other businesses such as hotels, banks and restaurants, although, due to the prevalence of pipeline vandalisation and oil bunkering, the federal government has not invested much in the development of the site.
 Okpu Umuobo River is the only natural water body in Osisioma Ngwa and most of its natural potential is yet to be harnessed and developed.
 The Ihumirinta of Ekeakpara – An ancient water source.
 The Obu of Umuoyoro Ngwa – A sacred tree worshipped by adherents of “owu miri” marine spirit.
 The Ihuada ala of Umuagbara -  A sacred traditional site.

Major markets
Apart from Ariaria International Market, the current urbanisation of Osisioma Ngwa Local Government Area and the influx of companies within the Local Government has adversely affected the popular ancient traditional markets. However, there are:

 Ekeakpara Market
 Nkwo Abayi (Osisioma Ngwa Industrial Market)
 Afoule (Abia Mega Mall)
 Ahia Nwankpa (Osisioma Ngwa Industrial Shoe Plaza)
 Nkwo Okpu Umuobo (Umuehilegbu Industrial Market)
 Ahia Ekenwaobasi (Osisioma Ngwa Model Foam Market)
 Afo Aro
 Ahia Orie Amato
 Eke Aro

Crime rate
Crime has been one of the major setbacks that has been detrimental  to the development of Osisioma Ngwa. From armed robbery attacks to kidnapping, every community and village in Osisioma has had its share of criminal incidents. The prevalence of crime has been attributed to lack of government investment in security; there is only one police station serving the entire Osisioma Ngwa LGA.

Postal code
The postal code of the area is 451.

Notable residents

Business 

 Dr Emmanuel Adaelu – The Chairman/CEO of Chemlap Nigeria Limited
 Prince Sunny Aku – CEO of Novena Majesty Furniture
 Chidi Onyeukwu Ajaegbu – Former President of ICAN
 Elder Allison Eneogwe – CEO of Alibon Industries Limited
 HRH Eze Gad Akwarandu - CEO Gadson chis Telecommunications Nigeria Limited

Politics 

 Late Chief Dr Clement Chima Nwafor – Former Deputy of Abia State
 Late Group Captain Monday Ikpeazu – Former Sole Administrator of Anambra State
 Chief Allen Nwachukwu – Former Chairman of Osisioma Ngwa LGA 
 Chief Chukwuemeka Eneogwe – Former Chairman of Osisioma Ngwa LGA
 Engr. Solomon Adaelu – Hon. Member Representing Obingwa, Osisioma and Ugwunagbo Federal Constituency at the National House of Assembly, Abuja
 Senator Nkechi Justina Nwaogu – Two Time Senator Abia Central Senatorial District and Immediate Past Pro Chancellor University of Calabar
 Barrister Loveday Nwauba – Former Commissioner for Technology, Abia State

Other prominent men and women 

 HRM Eze Christian E. Iheme, Great King of Isiala Okpu- The(Lion Kingdom) current - Chairman Osisioma Ngwa Council of Traditional Rulers
 HRM Ugoeze Stella Iheme - The Eagle of Isiala Okpu the (Lion Kingdom)
 Prince K.O. Mgbeahuru
 Justice Nwaogu
 Dr Ikechukwu Nwabeke
 Dr John Ahukanna
 Sir Chidi Nkoro
 Presiding Elder Chinedu Aku
 Chief Chidi Nwankpa
 Justice Nwabughiogu
 Sir S.N. Dinnaya
 Chief Dennis Nwankpa
 Engr. Edward O Onwunle Jr
 Chief Chinyere Amala
 Engr. Enyinnaya Nwafor

Entertainment 

 Nkiru Sylvanus – Nollywood actress

See also 
 List of villages in Abia State

References

Local Government Areas in Abia State
Populated places in Abia State